The 2000 United States presidential election in New Hampshire took place on Election Day on November 7, 2000 as part of the 2000 United States presidential election. The 2 major candidates were Texas Governor George W. Bush of the Republican Party and sitting Vice President Al Gore of the Democratic Party. When all votes were tallied, Bush was declared the winner with a plurality of the vote over Gore, receiving 48% of the vote to Gore's 47%, while Green Party candidate Ralph Nader received almost 4% of the vote in the state. Bush went on to win the election nationwide. Had incumbent Vice President Gore come out victorious with New Hampshire and its four electoral votes, he would have won the presidency, regardless of the outcome of Bush v. Gore. 

As of the 2020 presidential election, this is the last time that the Republican nominee carried New Hampshire, making it the only state to vote for the Republican ticket in 2000 to never do so again since, as every other state Bush won in 2000 voted for him again in 2004. It also marked the last time that a Republican won any electoral votes in New England, until Donald Trump won Maine's 2nd congressional district in 2016, and the last time a Republican won any state in the Northeastern United States until Donald Trump won Pennsylvania in 2016. This is the only presidential election since 1988 in which New Hampshire voted more Republican than Florida.
New Hampshire was 1 of 14 states to be carried by Bill Clinton at least once and 1 of 9 to be carried by Clinton twice that Gore (whom at the time of the 2000 election was serving as Clinton’s Vice President) lost to Bush.

Primaries
 2000 New Hampshire Democratic presidential primary
 2000 New Hampshire Republican presidential primary

Results

Results by county

Counties flipped from Democratic to Republican
 Coös (largest city: Berlin)
 Hillsborough (largest city: Manchester)
 Rockingham (largest municipality: Derry)
 Sullivan (largest city: Claremont)

By congressional district
Bush and Gore both won a congressional district. Gore won a district held by a Republican.

Analysis
In 2000, New Hampshire was considered a swing state. While it had voted Republican in every election from 1948 through 1988 except for 1964, Democrat Bill Clinton won the state twice in the 1990s, and polling indicated that the state would be a toss-up in 2000. New Hampshire would play a pivotal role in the outcome of the 2000 Presidential Election. 

George W. Bush defeated Al Gore in New Hampshire, by a narrow 1.27% (or a raw-vote margin of 7,211 votes), in the midst of one of the closest elections in US history. Had Gore won the state, New Hampshire's electoral college votes would have swung the national election in his favor. 

As of 2020, this is the most recent election in which a Republican presidential candidate has carried a state in New England, though Donald Trump would later win a single electoral vote from Maine in 2016 and 2020. Still, New Hampshire has continued to be regarded as a swing state. Beginning in 1972, it has consistently voted to the right of any other state in New England, and the Democratic margins of victory have stayed within single digits in every election following 2000, including a razor-thin 0.4% victory, or 2,736 votes, by Hillary Clinton in 2016. However, in 2020 Joe Biden carried the Granite State by a fairly comfortable 7.35%, prompting some to wonder whether it was losing its battleground-state status.

This election was the first and only time since 1944 that New Hampshire voted for a different candidate than neighboring Vermont, the only time ever that New Hampshire voted Republican while Vermont voted Democratic, and the only time since 1968 that New Hampshire voted differently than neighboring Maine.

Electors

Although voters select or write in their preferred candidate on a ballot, voters in New Hampshire, as in all 50 states and the District of Columbia, technically cast their ballots for electors: representatives to the Electoral College. Since New Hampshire is represented by 2 congressional districts and 2 senators, it is allocated 4 electoral votes. All candidates who appear on the ballot or qualify to receive write-in votes must submit a list of 4 electors, who pledge to vote for their candidate and their running mate. Whichever candidate wins the most votes in the state is awarded all four electoral votes. Their chosen electors then vote for president and vice president. Although electors are pledged to their candidate and running mate, they are not obligated to vote for them. An elector who votes for someone other than their candidate is known as a faithless elector.

The electors of each state and the District of Columbia met on December 18, 2000 to cast their votes for president and vice president. The Electoral College itself never meets as one body. Instead the electors from each state and the District of Columbia met in their respective capitols. 

The following were the members of the Electoral College from the state. All were pledged to and voted for George W. Bush and Dick Cheney:
Stephen Duprey
Wayne MacDonald
Augusta Petrone
Irusha Peiris

See also
 Presidency of George W. Bush
 United States presidential elections in New Hampshire

Notes

References

New Hampshire
2000
2000 New Hampshire elections